The Kamaraj Sagar Dam (also known as Sandynalla reservoir) is in the Nilgiris district of Tamil Nadu state in India. It is located at a distance of 10 km from the Ooty bus stand. It is a picnic spot and a film shooting spot on the slopes of the Wenlock Downs.

Activities 
The various tourist activities the dam include fishing and studying nature and environment.

See also
 Ooty Lake
 Stone House, Ooty
 Mariamman temple, Ooty
 Ooty Golf Course
 St. Stephen's Church, Ooty

Further reading

References 

Dams in Tamil Nadu
Tourist attractions in Nilgiris district
Buildings and structures in Ooty
Monuments and memorials to Kamaraj
Year of establishment missing